The Upper Kaleköy Dam, also known as the Yukarı Kaleköy Dam, is a gravity dam on the Murat River near the town of Kale in Solhan district of Bingöl Province, eastern Turkey. Construction on the dam began in 2012 and was completed in 2018. It is one of six major dams planned for the river. Its primary purpose is hydroelectric power generation and it supports a 636.6 MW hydroelectric power station. It is owned by Kalehan Energy Generation.

See also

Alpaslan-2 Dam – upstream, completed in 2021
Beyhan I Dam – downstream

References

Dams in Bingöl Province
Dams on the Murat River
Roller-compacted concrete dams
Hydroelectric power stations in Turkey
Gravity dams